Luis Gabriel Magdayao Moreno (born 28 May 1998) is a Filipino archer later actor who competed for the Philippines at the 2014 Summer Youth Olympics. Competing with Li Jiaman of China, Moreno is the first representative of the Philippines to clinch a gold medal for a Mixed-NOC team in the Summer Youth Olympics.

Career

Early years
Moreno picked up archery when he was six years old. He later went on to compete in the 2013 Palarong Pambansa in Dumaguete. He clinched 5 gold, 1 silver, and 1 bronze in his debut at the national student-athlete competition.

Summer Youth Olympics
Moreno represented the Philippines at the 2014 Summer Youth Olympics in China also serving as the flag bearer for his country in the parade of nations. Together with Li Jiaman of China, he won a gold medal at the mixed international team event.

Southeast Asian Games
Along with Florante Matan and Mark Javier, Moreno won over Vietnam to clinch the bronze medal in the men's recurve team event of the 2017 Southeast Asian Games in Kuala Lumpur, Malaysia.

Personal life
Moreno was a student at La Salle Green Hills. He is the grandson of television host German Moreno and is the nephew of actresses Shaina Magdayao and Vina Morales.

Filmography

Honors
Moreno was given a citation at the 2015 PSA Annual Awards by the Philippine Sportswriters Association for his feat in 2014. He was also given a sports achievement award by the De La Salle Alumni Association in 2021.

References

External links
 World Archery biography
 Nanjing Youth Olympics 2014 biography

1998 births
Living people
Filipino male archers
Archers at the 2014 Summer Youth Olympics
Competitors at the 2015 Southeast Asian Games
Southeast Asian Games bronze medalists for the Philippines
Southeast Asian Games medalists in archery
Competitors at the 2017 Southeast Asian Games